Pensive (February 5, 1941 – May 20, 1949) was a bright chestnut Thoroughbred racehorse that in 1944 won the first two legs of the U.S. Triple Crown. Pensive also began only the second sire line "hat trick" in the Kentucky Derby, as his son Ponder won the 1949 Derby, and Ponder's son Needles won the 1956 edition.

Background
He was sired by Hyperion, out of Penicuik II (by Buchan). Pensive was brought to the United States still in utero by Arthur B. Hancock, who then sold the mare to the owner of Calumet Farm, Warren Wright. Wright had inherited Calumet from his father, William Monroe Wright, president of the Calumet Baking Powder Company. Pensive began his training under Calumet's future Hall of Fame trainer Ben A. Jones.

Racing career
At two, Pensive raced five times, winning twice.  His three losses all came in stakes races.  At three, he ran a checkered season, winning and losing fairly equally.  He beat older horses in the Rowe Memorial Handicap, but lost to an older horse, Tola Rose, in the Bowie Handicap.  Tola Rose had defeated Whirlaway in the Butler Memorial Handicap.

Pensive, ridden by Conn McCreary, won the Kentucky Derby going away by four and a half lengths.  A week later, he took the Preakness. That year, the Belmont (at the time the least of the three races), had upped its purse to $50,000.  Pensive was in the lead when Bounding Home inched by to take the race by less than half a length.

Following his loss in the Belmont, Pensive lost all eight of his final starts.

Stud record
Pensive was retired to stud, producing the winner of the 1949 Kentucky Derby, Ponder.  He died in 1949, just after his son won the Derby.  Pensive is buried at Calumet Farm.

Breeding

References

 Pensive's pedigree with photo
 Pensive's Kentucky Derby

1941 racehorse births
1949 racehorse deaths
Racehorses bred in Kentucky
Racehorses trained in the United States
Kentucky Derby winners
Preakness Stakes winners
Thoroughbred family 1-p